John Donley is a writer from Gould, Arkansas.

Donley wrote in many sitcoms including Sanford and Son, Good Times, The Jeffersons, Diff’rent Strokes, Benson and Who's the Boss. He won an NAACP Image Award for best situation comedy in 1984.
In 2019 he was inducted into the Arkansas Black Hall of Fame.

Career

The first script Donley sold was Black Jesus, which was the second episode of Good Times. In 1984, his episode Roots on the comedy Diff’rent Strokes earned him an NAACP Image Award for Best Situation Comedy Episode.

References

External links

Living people
Year of birth missing (living people)
People from Lincoln County, Arkansas
Screenwriters from Arkansas
American male television writers